Otto C. Uehling (July 17, 1865 – December 10, 1947) was an American engineer and architect working in Milwaukee, Wisconsin.

Early life and education
He graduated from the University of Wisconsin in 1890.

Career
He opened an office on Grove Street in 1892. He later worked from 509 First National Bank Building. His work includes several manufacturing plants including what is now the Phoenix Building, churches, and residences.

In 1894 he partnered with I. Jay Knapp who later moved to Washington state and Oregon. Uehling partnered with Carl L. Linde to form the firm Uehling and Linde. Charles Holst was one of their draftsman. They were included in the book Notable Men of Wisconsin in 1902. Linde went on to have a successful career in Portland, Oregon. Joseph Lindl was a draftsman for him in 1902.

In 1902, he became vice-president of the reorganized Merkel Manufacturing Company (Flying Merkel) that made motorcycles and bicycles. He was also involved with the Wisconsin Ice Machine Company.

Later life

Uehling died on December 10, 1947. He is buried in Richwood Cemetery in Richwood, Wisconsin.

Work
St. Peter's Evangelical Lutheran Church (Milwaukee, Wisconsin) 1898 Social Hall
Saint Jacobi Evangelical Lutheran Church (1905) 1321 West Mitchell Street
Phoenix Knitting Company Plant #4 (1918) at 219 North Milwaukee Street, renamed the Phoenix Building in 1980, part of Milwaukee's Historic Third Ward
2757 Oakland Ave. (1901)
Christensen Engineering Company expansion (1902)
R.J. Schwab and Sons building (1906) at 612 South 2nd Street
Tuberculosis sanitorium in Jefferson County, Wisconsin (1918)
Machine shop for T. L. Smith Machine Co.
Hummel-Downing Company paper box plant
Dye manufacturing plant for Universal Aniline Dyes & Chemical Co
Washington Cutlery Company factory building
Phoenix Knitting Works building at 311 East Chicago
St. Stephen's Lutheran Church (1901) at what is now 1136 South 5th Street. A Milwaukee landmark.
703-705 Locust Street (1913), Uehling and Kleser

References

External links

1865 births
1947 deaths
University of Wisconsin–Madison alumni
Architects from Milwaukee
Engineers from Wisconsin
Businesspeople from Wisconsin
20th-century American businesspeople
20th-century American architects
20th-century American engineers